Viktor Gjika (23 June 1937 – 3 March 2009) was an Albanian director, filmmaker and screenwriter. For his distinguished and remarkable contribution to the cinema, he was awarded the highest title as People's Artist in 1985. He graduated from VKIG Cinematographic Institute of Moscow in Russia. Together with a classmate, presenting their academic degree when graduated, they shot the short film Nobody Ever Dies, based on Ernest Hemingway's story of the same name, which was awarded the First Prize at the Worldwide Cinematographic Institutes Film Festival in the Netherlands in 1961. He created more than 15 movies and over 25 documentary films.

He was the general director of Shqiperia e Re National Film Studio in Tirana for almost 10 years in the 1980s, until 1991.

He was a member of several international film festival juries such as Giffoni Film Festival, Annecy Film Festival, and others.

Filmography

As film director 

  (2004)
  (2002)
  (2000)
  (1997)
  (1997)
  (1995)
  (1988)
  (1985)
  (1983)
 The Second November (1982)
  (1981)
  (1980)
  (1980)
  (1979)
 The General Gramophone (1978)
 The Man with the Cannon (1977)
  (1976)
  (1974)
  (1974)
  (1974)
  (1972)
  (1970)
  (1970)
  (1970)
  (1968)
  (1966)
  (1965)
  (1964)
  (1964)
  (1962)
  (1961)

As screenwriter 

  (2000)
  (1997)
  (1995)
  (1989)
  (1980)
  (1977)
  (1974)
  (1972)
  (1970)
  (1970)
  (1970)
  (1966)
  (1964)
  (1964)
  (1961)

As cameraman 

  (1996)
  (1980)
 The General Gramophone (1978)
  (1968)
  (1966)
  (1965)
  (1964)
  (1964)
  (1964)
  (1963)
  (1962)
 Debatik (1961)
  (1961)
  (1961)

References 

1937 births
2009 deaths
People from Korçë
Albanian film directors
Albanian screenwriters
20th-century screenwriters